The Master, or Missy, is a recurring character in the British science fiction television series Doctor Who and its associated spin-off works. They are a renegade alien Time Lord and the childhood friend and later archenemy of the title character, the Doctor. They were most recently portrayed by Sacha Dhawan. 

Multiple actors have played the Master since the character's introduction in 1971. Within the show's narrative, the change in actors and subsequent change of the character's appearance is sometimes explained as the Master taking possession of other characters' bodies or as a consequence of regeneration, which is a biological attribute that allows Time Lords to survive fatal injuries or old age.

The Master was originally played by Roger Delgado from 1971 until his death in 1973. The role was subsequently played by Peter Pratt, Geoffrey Beevers, and Anthony Ainley, with Ainley reprising the role regularly through the 1980s until the series’s cancellation  in 1989. Eric Roberts took on the role for the 1996 Doctor Who TV film. Since the show's revival in 2005, the Master has been portrayed by Derek Jacobi, John Simm, Michelle Gomez, and Sacha Dhawan.

Beevers, Roberts, Jacobi, Simm, and Gomez have reprised the role in audio dramas produced by Big Finish Productions. At the same time, Alex Macqueen, Gina McKee, Mark Gatiss, James Dreyfus, and Milo Parker portrayed incarnations unique to Big Finish.

Origins 
The creative team conceived of the Master as a recurring villain, first appearing in Terror of the Autons (1971). The Master's title was deliberately chosen by producer Barry Letts and script editor Terrance Dicks because, like the Doctor, it was a title conferred by an academic degree. A sketch of three "new characters" for 1971 (the other two being Jo Grant and Mike Yates) suggested he was conceived to be of "equal, perhaps even superior rank, to the Doctor."

Letts only had one man in mind for the role: Roger Delgado, who had a long history of playing villains and had already made three attempts to be cast in the series. He had worked previously with Letts and was a good friend of Jon Pertwee.

Malcolm Hulke spoke of the character and his relationship with the Doctor: "There was a peculiar relationship between the Master and the Doctor: one felt that the Master wouldn't really have liked to eliminate the Doctor...you see the Doctor was the only person like him at the time in the whole universe, a renegade Time Lord and in a funny sort of way they were partners in crime."

An unrelated character also known as the Master, who ruled over the Land of Fiction, had previously appeared in the 1968 serial The Mind Robber opposite the Second Doctor.

Aims and character 
A would-be universal conqueror, the Master wants to control the universe. In The Deadly Assassin (1976), his ambitions are described as becoming "the master of all matter". He also had a secondary objective: to make the Doctor suffer. In The Sea Devils (1972), the Master mentions that the "pleasure" of seeing the destruction of the human race, of which the Doctor is fond, would be "a reward in itself."

History within the show

Encounters with the Third Doctor 
The Master, as played by Roger Delgado, makes his first appearance in Terror of the Autons (1971), where he allies with the Nestene Consciousness to help them invade Earth. The Third Doctor (Jon Pertwee) convinces the Master to stop this plan at the last minute, and the Master subsequently escapes, albeit with his TARDIS left non-functioning after the Doctor confiscates the ship's dematerialisation circuit.

Having become a main character in the show's eighth season, the Master reappears in The Mind of Evil, where he regains his TARDIS's circuit from the Doctor after attempting to launch a nerve gas missile that would initiate World War III. The Master is seen again in another incursion on Earth in The Claws of Axos, and then fails to hold the galaxy to ransom using a doomsday weapon on the planet Uxarieus in the year 2472 in Colony in Space. In The Dæmons, The Master is finally captured on Earth by the organization UNIT after Jo Grant (Katy Manning) prevents the alien Azal (Stephen Thorne) from giving The Master his powers.

In The Sea Devils (1972), the Master is shown to be imprisoned on an island off the coast of England. He convinces the governor of the prison, Colonel Trenchard (Clive Morton), to help him steal electronics from HMS Seaspite, the nearby naval base. This allows the Master to contact the reptilian Sea Devils, the former rulers of Earth, so he can help them retake the planet from humanity. The Master convinces the Doctor to help him build machinery that would bring the Sea Devils out of their millions of years of hibernation. Still, the Doctor sabotages the device by overloading it, destroying the Sea Devil base, and preventing war between humanity and reptiles. The Master subsequently escapes in a hovercraft. The Doctor reveals in this serial that the Master was once a "very good friend" of his.

Delgado's last appearance as the Master is in Frontier in Space (1973), where he works alongside the Dalek and Ogron races to provoke a war between the Human and Draconian Empires. The scheme fails, and the Master escapes after he shoots at the Doctor.

Delgado was slated to return in a serial called The Final Game, which would have been the season 11 finale. However, he died in a car crash in June 1973, and the story was never produced.

A new regeneration cyclethe long serving Master
Played by Peter Pratt in his next appearance, the Master returns in The Deadly Assassin (1976), opposite the Fourth Doctor (Tom Baker). Special effects makeup was applied to Pratt to give the Master a corpse-like appearance. Found by Chancellor Goth (Bernard Horsfall) on the planet Tersurus, the Master is revealed to be in his final regeneration and near the end of his final life. The Master attempts to gain a new regeneration cycle by using the artefacts of Rassilon, the symbols of the President of the Council of Time Lords, to manipulate the Eye of Harmony at the cost of Gallifrey. But the Doctor stops the Master, who escapes after his assumed death.

The Master later returns in The Keeper of Traken, the role taken over by Geoffrey Beevers. Still dying, the Master came to the Traken Union to renew his life by using the empire's technological Source. Though the plot fails, the Master manages to cheat death by transferring his essence into the body of a Traken scientist named Tremas (Anthony Ainley) and overwriting his host's mind.

The Master (Ainley, in a total of 31 episodes as the character) would confront the next three regenerations of the Doctor on and off for the rest of the classic series, still seeking to extend his life – preferably with a new set of regenerations. Subsequently, in The Five Doctors (1983), the Time Lords offer the Master a new regeneration cycle in exchange for his help.

The Master's final appearance in the classic series is in Survival (1989, the final story of the series' original 26-year run), trapped on the planet of the Cheetah People and under its influence, which drives its victims to savagery. Though the Master manages to escape the doomed planet, he ends up back on the planet prior to its destruction when he attempts to kill the Seventh Doctor (Sylvester McCoy).

Dalek trial and 'execution' 
The Master was the primary antagonist of the 1996 Doctor Who television movie. He was played by American actor Eric Roberts.

In the prologue, the Master (portrayed briefly by Gordon Tipple) is executed by the Daleks as a punishment for his "evil crimes". But before his apparent death, the Master requests his remains to be brought back to Gallifrey by the Seventh Doctor. However, as posited in the novelisation of the movie by Gary Russell, the Master's self-alterations to extend his lifespan allow him to survive his execution by transferring his mind into a snake-like entity called a "morphant." This interpretation is made explicit in the first of the Eighth Doctor Adventures novels, The Eight Doctors by Terrance Dicks, and also used in the Doctor Who Magazine comic strip story The Fallen, which states that the morphant was a shape-shifting animal native to Skaro.

Using his morphant body to break free from the container holding his remains, the Master sabotages the Doctor's TARDIS console to force it to crash land in San Francisco in December, 1999. From there, the Master, as the morphant, enters the body of a paramedic named Bruce to take control of him. However, the Master finds his human host to be unsustainable as the body slowly begins to degenerate, although the Master has the added abilities to spit an acid-like bile, both as a weapon and to mentally control victims as an alternative to his usual hypnotic abilities. The Master attempts to access the Eye of Harmony to steal the remaining regenerations of the Eighth Doctor (Paul McGann), but instead is sucked into it and supposedly killed.

Professor Yana 
In "Utopia", a scientist called Professor Yana (Derek Jacobi) is revealed to be the Master, disguised in biological human form to hide from the Time War. Yana overhears a conversation between the Doctor and Jack Harkness about the time vortex and time travel in general. He used the Chameleon Arch to temporarily place his Time Lord identity within a Fob Watch. This makes Yana curious about his own fob watch and when he opens it he is reunited with the Master's consciousness. The Master is shot and regenerates into a new body (John Simm) and steals the Doctor's TARDIS.

Harold Saxon 
In "The Sound of Drums," the Doctor makes his way back to Earth to find the Master has become Prime Minister of the UK under the alias of Harold Saxon. The Master kidnaps Martha's family and conquers Earth.

In "Last of the Time Lords", Martha spends a year working to save her family and to thwart the Master's plan to wage war against the universe. The Master himself mentions that looking into the vortex as a child made "the drumming" choose him as a "call to war" in his head. When fatally shot by his human wife, Lucy Saxon (Alexandra Moen), the Master refuses to regenerate, knowing it will haunt the Doctor.

The Master returns in "The End of Time" (2009–2010) when his disciples attempt a resurrection ritual using a surviving piece of the Master's body. However, Lucy sabotages the ritual, bringing the Master back as a manic undead creature, hungry for human flesh and leaking electrical energy. The Master proceeds with a plot to transform the entire human race into his own clones. The Master is sent back to Gallifrey when the Time Lords are sealed away in the Time War, trapped once more.

Missy  
The Master influences the Doctor's life in the seventh series episode "The Bells of Saint John", when an unseen "woman in the shop" gives Clara Oswald the phone number to the TARDIS, initiating Clara's time as a companion. Independent of any connection to the "woman in the shop", an unidentified woman (Michelle Gomez) appears briefly in the eighth series episode "Deep Breath", welcoming a character to the afterlife. This mystery woman, and the fact that she is the "woman in the shop", is not revealed to be the Doctor's childhood friend until "Dark Water", when she formally introduces herself to the Doctor as a new female incarnation called "Missy", which is short for "Mistress". She reveals that she has created an "afterlife" from a Gallifreyan Matrix Data Slice, it stores the consciousness of dead people so they can eventually be made into Cybermen.

In "Death in Heaven", Missy offers the Doctor control of her Cybermen army in the hopes of compromising his morality. She is defeated when her Cyber army is destroyed, and appears vaporised when shot by the posthumously cyber-converted Brigadier Lethbridge-Stewart. Missy returns in "The Magician's Apprentice"/"The Witch's Familiar" (2015), revealed to have faked her demise using a teleporter powered by the energy of the Cyberman laser weapon that shot her.

In the tenth series episode "Extremis", it is revealed that the Doctor is keeping Missy in the well appointed Vault, having spared her from execution but vowing to keep her locked away for one thousand years. In "The Lie of the Land", the Doctor's crew visits Missy in the Vault to gain intelligence on the Monks. Her demeanour seems little changed, and she has low regard for human life, but in the episode's coda, she sheds remorseful tears for all the millions of deaths she has caused. In "Empress of Mars," she returns the Doctor's TARDIS to Mars to rescue the Doctor and Bill. In "The Eaters of Light," she has been released from her cage by the Doctor to run repairs on his TARDIS, which is isomorphically locked so that she cannot pilot it.

The Doctor attempts to test Missy's reformation in the tenth series finale "World Enough and Time"/"The Doctor Falls" by sending Missy, Bill, and Nardole (Matt Lucas) on a rescue mission aboard a spaceship experiencing time dilation near a black hole. However, the Master (John Simm) is aboard the ship and has initiated the Cybermen's genesis. Missy's loyalties are torn between the Doctor and her old self. After initially betraying the Doctor, she later stands alongside him against a Cyberman army, stabbing her past self causing the Master to regenerate. Enraged at Missy becoming the Doctor's ally, the Master shoots Missy with his laser screwdriver, ostensibly disabling her ability to regenerate and killing her.

Spy Master and Grigori Rasputin 

During "Spyfall" the Thirteenth Doctor seeks out a former MI6 agent known as 'O' (Sacha Dhawan) who reveals himself as a new incarnation of the Master during the cliffhanger, having killed the real O and assumed his identity. In "The Timeless Children", the Master takes the Doctor into the ruins of Gallifrey, and reveals how the Time Lords secretly acquired the power to regenerate by harvesting the DNA of the Timeless Child, who is revealed to be the Doctor, who lived throughout Gallifrey's civilisation and had her memory wiped on at least one occasion.

The Master attempts to kill the Lone Cyberman and persuades the Cyberium, an AI containing all Cyberman knowledge and history, to use his body as a host. Using the Cyberium, the Master creates a new Cyberman race with regenerative abilities from dead Time Lords. The Doctor fails to defeat the Master using the "Death Particle", which can destroy all organic life on a planet. Ko Sharmus, the Boundary guardian, blames himself for the new Cyberman race as he was responsible for hiding the Cyberium and failed. As the Doctor escapes, Ko Sharmus sacrifices himself by detonating the Death Particle, ostensibly killing the Master and his army of Cyber Masters.

After a hint in "The Vanquishers" (2021), Dhawan's Master returned in "The Power of the Doctor" (2022), Jodie Whittaker's final episode as the Thirteenth Doctor, In the episode, the Master, having survived the Death Particle, becomes Grigori Rasputin in 1916 Russia and allies with his Cybermasters and the Daleks. After baiting UNIT by defacing famous paintings, he and his allies capture the Doctor, whom he takes back to 1916. He reveals his plan to turn the Earth into a foundry for the Cybermen and Daleks, and uses the energy of a captured being called a Qurunx to forcibly regenerate the Doctor into him. 

The Master, now possessing the Doctor's body and TARDIS, intends to tarnish her name by using it as a force for terror, and begins to enact his plan. However, companion Yasmin Khan shoves him out of the TARDIS, and uses a failsafe holographic AI of the Doctor to help former companions Tegan Jovanka and Ace stop the Cybermen and the Daleks while she recaptures the Master, using the Master's own equipment and the energies of the Time Lord/Cyberman hybrids to reverse the regeneration, returning the Doctor to her thirteenth body. After the restored Doctor and her various allies stop the Cybermen and Daleks, she frees the Qurunx and has it destroy the Master's planet with an energy beam. In his weakened, original body, the Master aims the beam at the Doctor (triggering her next regeneration) before collapsing near his own TARDIS. Yaz manages to rescue the Doctor, but the Master is left behind on the imploding planet, seemingly perishing along with it.

Characteristics

Intelligence and attitude 
The Master and the Doctor are shown to have similar levels of intelligence, and were classmates at the Time Lord Academy on Gallifrey, where the Master outperformed the Doctor. A similar connection between the two was also referenced in "The End of Time" in which the Master reminisces with the Tenth Doctor about his father's estates on Gallifrey and his childhood with the Doctor before saying "look at us now". In the 2007 episode "Utopia", the Tenth Doctor calls the transformed and disguised Master a genius and shows admiration for his intellect before discovering his true identity. The Tenth Doctor further expresses admiration for the Master's intellect in "The End of Time" by calling him "stone cold brilliant" and yet states that the Master could be more if he would just give up his desire for domination. The Twelfth Doctor states that Missy is "the one person almost as smart as me" ("The Lie of the Land").

Delgado's portrayal of the Master was that of a suave and charming sociopathic individual, able to be polite and murderous at almost the same time. His design is an homage to the classic Svengali character: a black Nehru outfit with a beard and moustache.

Aspects of Simm's portrayal of the Master parallel David Tennant's Doctor, primarily in his ability to make light of tense situations and his rather quirky and hyperactive personality. According to the producers, this was done to make the Master more threatening to the Doctor by having him take one of his opponent's greatest strengths, as well as making the parallels between the two characters more distinctive. This rationale is written into dialogue by the Master in "Utopia," in which he explicitly states, as he is regenerating, that if the Doctor can be young and strong, then so can he. In an episode of Doctor Who Confidential, "Lords and Masters," Russell T Davies also classifies the Master as both a sociopath and a psychopath.

Michelle Gomez maintained Simm's portrayal of the character, specifically the psychopathic behaviour and inappropriate emotional responses to certain situations. She also portrayed the original traditions of ruthless, murderous behaviour and grandiose, Machiavellian criminal intelligence that have been consistent throughout all incarnations. However, she also displayed a much more coquettish manner, with her new female identity allowing her to fully express aspects of the Master's ambiguous bond with the Doctor (as previously explored by Simm's incarnation in "The Sound of Drums"). While determined to torment and corrupt the Doctor with moral temptation while inflicting pain and death to humanity, she frequently referred to him as her "boyfriend" or "friend" and appeared to desire his acquiescence and company ultimately. She is also well aware that she is even more dangerously psychopathic than before, describing herself as "bananas" to UNIT agent Osgood right before killing her ("Death in Heaven"). However, when circumstances result in Missy being kept in a vault and monitored by the Doctor after an averted execution, Missy actually comes to show signs of remorse for what she had done in the past, to the point that she prepares to side with the Doctor over her own past incarnation ("The Doctor Falls").

Dhawan's Master returns to the Master's love of evil for the sake of being evil, proclaiming at one point that he kills because he's good at it and asking why he should ever stop. Where Missy's actions were based around a twisted attraction to the Doctor, Dhawan's Master destroys Gallifrey simply because he cannot bring himself to accept a discovery that suggests Time Lord society owes regeneration and other secrets of its past to the child that became the Doctor. He perceives this as creating a twisted link between the Doctor and himself.

Mental abilities 
Both the Doctor and the Master have been shown to be skilled hypnotists, although the Master's capacity to dominate – even by stare and voice alone – has been shown to be far more pronounced. In Logopolis, the Doctor said of the Master, "He's a Time Lord. In many ways, we have the same mind." The Master is often able to anticipate the Doctor's moves, as seen in stories such as Castrovalva, The Keeper of Traken, Time-Flight, and The King's Demons, where he plans elaborate traps for the Doctor, only revealing his presence at the key moment. In The Deadly Assassin, the Master was able to send a false premonition as a telepathic message to the Doctor, but it is unclear whether he performed this through innate psychic ability, or was aided technologically.

In "The End of Time," the Master uses a kind of psychic technique, previously used by the Doctor to read the minds of others, allowing the Doctor to hear the constant 'drumming' inside the Master's mind.

TARDIS 
In the original series, the Master's TARDISes have had fully functioning chameleon circuits, having appeared as various things, including a horsebox, a spaceship, a fir tree, a computer bank, a grandfather clock, a fluted architectural column, an iron maiden, a fireplace, a British Airways jet, a cottage and a triangular column. Of the Master's TARDISes seen in The Keeper of Traken, one appears as the calcified, statue-like Melkur, able to move and even walk; the other appears as a grandfather clock. The Melkur TARDIS is destroyed. At one point in Logopolis, the Master's TARDIS even appears as a police box, like the Doctor's.

Missy uses a vortex manipulator rather than a TARDIS in series nine. She used a pair of them which were linked to one another, to transport herself and Clara Oswald to the Doctor's 'farewell party' in medieval Essex ("The Magician's Apprentice"). They are destroyed in "The Witch's Familiar" when, to avoid being killed by Daleks, they channel energy from the Daleks' weapons to teleport them away, looking as if they were exterminated.

In The Doctor Falls, the Master acquired a TARDIS before leaving Gallifrey but burnt out its dematerialisation circuit while attempting to get away from a black hole too fast. His future incarnation Missy provides him with a spare, and the Master can fix his TARDIS and depart.

In "Spyfall, Part 1", the disguised Master lives in a barn which he later reveals to be his TARDIS. In Part 2, he is shown flying this TARDIS to London in 1834 and Paris in 1943. The Thirteenth Doctor later steals it from him to return to the present after being trapped in the past without her TARDIS. This is the first time since the show's revival that the Master's TARDIS interior is shown on screen and is noted to be the same size on the inside.

Handheld weaponry 
The Master's weapon of choice in the original show's run was the "tissue compression eliminator," which shrinks its target to doll-like proportions, killing them in the process. Its appearance is similar to that of the Doctor's tool, the sonic screwdriver.

Despite his own fondness for the weapon, Russell T Davies decided against bringing it back for the Master's reappearance in "The Sound of Drums" because the Master had too many new "tricks" to use against the Doctor.

In some audio dramas, the Master has used a staser pistol rather than the tissue compression eliminator.

During the course of "The Sound of Drums," the Master unveils a new handheld weapon: a laser screwdriver. The device functions as a powerful laser weapon, capable of killing with a single shot. It also carries the ability to age victims rapidly using a miniaturised version of the genetic manipulator developed by Professor Lazarus ("The Lazarus Experiment"). The screwdriver is biometrically secured so that only the Master can use it. In "The Doctor Falls," the Master uses a laser screwdriver again to battle the Cybermen. After being stabbed by Missy, the Master shoots her with the laser screwdriver at "full blast," which he said would prevent her regeneration and kill her permanently.

In "Dark Water"/"Death in Heaven," Missy uses a small hand-held device, about the size of a large mobile phone, which allows her to control her technology and scan her surroundings remotely. It also contains a weapon that she uses to disintegrate Dr. Chang, Osgood, and Seb. In "The Magician's Apprentice," Missy uses a newer, upgraded version of this device which appears to be more powerful. It allowed her to control airborne planes after she had frozen them in time and simultaneously disintegrate several UNIT guards.

Missy's parasol is revealed to be a disguised sonic/laser device in "The Doctor Falls." She uses it to defend against an attacking Cyberman. A more unusual feature, demonstrated in "Death in Heaven," allows her to travel through the air like Mary Poppins.

Missy says her brooch contains a Gallifreyan Dark Star alloy pin, given to her by the Doctor which she uses to pierce a Dalek's armoured shell. In "The Doctor Falls," Missy uses a small blade concealed in her sleeve to stab her own past self, triggering his off-screen regeneration.

In "Spyfall," the Tissue Compression Eliminator returns as the Master, having regained his manic state, reveals he used it to steal the identity of an ally of the Doctor. He also used it to bring the Doctor to his mercy by threatening to use it on people in 1834. In "The Timeless Children," the Master threatens the Doctor's human friends with it to get her to return to Gallifrey with him and later kills Ashad, the Lone Cyberman, with the Tissue Compression Eliminator. The Master used it again in "The Power of the Doctor," revealing that the Tissue Compression Eliminator could work in reverse and unleashing a Cyberman army, including Ashad, encapsulated in a single miniaturised Cyberman.

In other media 
The Master has featured in numerous Doctor Who spin-offs. One of the most notable of these other appearances is David A. McIntee's "Master trilogy" of novels comprising The Dark Path and First Frontier in the Virgin Publishing lines and The Face of the Enemy for BBC Books, and the Doctor Who audio dramas produced by Big Finish Productions, in which various actors have reprised the role from the TV series or played original versions of the Master.

Novels 
The Master's past with the Doctor is explored somewhat in The Dark Path, which reveals that his name before taking the alias of the Master is Koschei, when he encounters the Second Doctor during their travels. Although initially a somewhat anti-heroic version of the Doctor, willing to murder the first option to save the day but generally still trying to do the right, Koschei turns to evil and becomes the Master after he discovers that his companion and lover, Ailla, is an undercover agent of the Celestial Intervention Agency sent to spy on him. During the course of the novel, Ailla is shot and killed, with Koschei not knowing that she is a Time Lord and will simply regenerate, completing a time-based weapon to benefit the anti-alien efforts of soldiers from Earth's Empire in an attempt to bring her back. The weapon is used to destroy the planet Teriliptus and its inhabitants. Still, when Ailla turns up alive, the knowledge that he has destroyed a planet for nothing, coupled with the revelation of Ailla's betrayal, proves too much. Koschei resolves to bring his own order to the universe at the expense of free will and becoming its Master. Thanks to the Doctor reprogramming his weapon, Koschei is trapped in a black hole at the end of the novel, with it being left uncertain how he will escape. The cover art of The Dark Path depicts Koschei as being already the same regeneration as the Delgado-era Master.

The Face of the Enemy centres around the Delgado-era Master, but includes a cameo by a Koschei from an alternate timeline (specifically, the timeline the Third Doctor visited in Inferno) who never became the Master. This version of Koschei is still a loyal Time Lord who becomes stranded on the alternate Earth after that universe's version of The Web of Fear destroyed his TARDIS. He is subsequently captured and forced to work for the fascist rulers, who keep him alive, in agony, using life support systems. When the Master, crossing over from the other universe, learns of this, he ends his counterpart's life in a rare moment of compassion.

Last of the Gaderene by Mark Gatiss and Deadly Reunion by Terrance Dicks and Barry Letts are both close homages to the Delgado/Pertwee stories. In Last of the Gaderene, the Master, disguised as Police Inspector Lemaitre, assists an alien race called the Gaderene to invade Earth, starting with a small village. In Deadly Reunion, he attempts to control powerful forces through a cult, but finds himself at the mercy of a godlike alien. The Delgado Master also appears in Verdigris by Paul Magrs, a more parodic take on the Pertwee era. The eponymous genie spends much of the novel impersonating the Master, who is in fact controlling him: the real Master appears in the novel's epilogue, buying a Chinese takeaway.

The reason the Master is so emaciated when he appears in The Deadly Assassin is explored in John Peel's novel Legacy of the Daleks, in which he attempts to capture the Doctor's granddaughter Susan Foreman, resulting in an out-of-sequence encounter with the Eighth Doctor when the Doctor receives a telepathic cry of distress from Susan and attempts to trace it back to before its origin. The Master is badly burned when she attacks him in self-defence and takes possession of his TARDIS. After Susan escapes, the dying Master is eventually found by Chancellor Goth on the planet Tersurus, which leads directly into the events of The Deadly Assassin.

The Ainley-era Master appears in the novel The Quantum Archangel by Craig Hinton, a direct sequel to The Time Monster. In this novel, he poses as a Serbian businessman called Gospodar- prompting the Sixth Doctor to wonder if he's "running out of languages"- while attempting to subvert the power of the higher dimensions to turn himself into a god. However, it to be revealed that this plan was actually the result of the machinations of the Chronovore/Eternal hybrid Kronos trying to trick the Master into punishing the Chronovores for his lifetime of imprisonment, with one of the Master's pawns being transformed into the titular Quantum Archangel when she absorbs the higher-dimensional energy as the Master tests his equipment. As the novel concludes, the Master briefly regresses to his crippled and burned form while the Doctor absorbs more of the excess energy to delay the Quantum Archangel on her level, but the story ends with the Master having restored himself to physical health with a boost of the last dregs of higher-dimensional power (although he is apparently subsequently attacked by a group of chronovores).

First Frontier shows the Master (apparently the Ainley version) finally acquiring a new body, who according to McIntee is based on the cinema persona of Basil Rathbone, using nanites provided by the alien race known as the Tzun in exchange for his help in setting up their 'invasion' of Earth. This incarnation reappears in Happy Endings by Paul Cornell, Virgin Publishing's celebratory fiftieth Virgin New Adventures novel, once again trying to restore his ability to regenerate, suggesting that the Tzun nanites failed to sustain him long-term. After the broadcast of the television movie, some fans suggested that this is the incarnation briefly played by Gordon Tipple in the prologue, eventually succumbing once again to the cheetah virus in the first Eighth Doctor novel The Eight Doctors.

Before the end of the Virgin Missing Adventures series, the Delgado version of the Master appeared in the novel Who Killed Kennedy, depicting him setting up a complex plan to manipulate a journalist to bother UNIT by convincing him that they are part of a corrupt conspiracy, which, while published by Virgin, was not considered part of the Missing Adventures series.

The short story "Stop The Pigeon" by Robert Perry and Mike Tucker, and the Past Doctor Adventure Prime Time, by Tucker, are probably set before First Frontier and feature the Ainley Master looking for a cure for the Cheetah virus.

Gallifrey and the Time Lords are destroyed in the Eighth Doctor Adventures novel The Ancestor Cell, but in The Adventuress of Henrietta Street a mysterious stranger wearing a rosette appears who could have been the Master, somehow surviving the cataclysm. In Lance Parkin's The Gallifrey Chronicles, a surviving Time Lord named Marnal appears, and it is implied that he may have been the Master's father, as he mentions being visited by his Time Lord son in the 70s, which matches up with the Delgado Master. In the same novel (and earlier, in Sometime Never...), the Doctor talks with a malign entity within the TARDIS' Eye of Harmony, which could have been the Roberts Master, throwing the true identity of the Man with the Rosette into doubt. The entity within the Eye refers to itself as an "echo", thus leaving scope for the real Master to be elsewhere. (In his Doctor Who chronology book AHistory, Parkin suggests that Lawrence Miles intended the Man with the Rosette to be the Master, even if it was not explicitly stated.)

Another version of the Master appears in The Infinity Doctors (also by Parkin), where he is known as the Magistrate and is, once again, the Doctor's friend, although when this takes place in continuity is unclear. Parkin has stated that the novel can fit into continuity and that its incarnation of the Master is based on Richard E. Grant.

During the Faction Paradox arc that runs through the Eighth Doctor Adventures, a character known as the War King is featured, which is implied to be a future incarnation of the Master. The character is also referenced in The Book of the War, published by Mad Norwegian Press when the Faction Paradox stories spun off into their own continuity. Later Faction Paradox stories confirm the Magistrate is the younger version of the War King, which had been implied in The Taking of Planet 5.

Alastair Reynolds' novel Harvest of Time published in 2013 features the Roger Delgado incarnation, set after his capture at the end of The Dæmons and before he escapes from prison in The Sea Devils. In the course of the novel, the Master is nearly erased from history by an ancient race known as the Sild, who have captured multiple incarnations of the Master to create a complex temporal manipulator by linking the Masters in a neural network, but the Doctor and the Master track the Sild to their origin, allowing the Master to take control of the Sild's network and turn it against them before his other selves rebel against his control, forcing him to allow the other Masters to escape.

Comic strips 
The Doctor Who Magazine (DWM) 1992 Winter Special comic Flashback shows a young Master (here called "Magnus") and Doctor on Gallifrey. The Master plans to use a living entity to harness Arton Energy, only for the Doctor to thwart his plans.

The Master returns in a new body and guise, that of a street preacher, in the previously mentioned the DWM comic strip story The Fallen, although the Doctor does not recognise him. The Master reveals himself a few stories later, in The Glorious Dead. The Master had survived the events of the television movie by encountering a cosmic being named Esterath in the time vortex. Esterath controls the Glory, the focal point of the Omniversal spectrum which underlies all existence. The Master's scheme to take control of the Glory fails, and he is banished to parts unknown (see Kroton).

In Character Assassin in DWM No. 311, the Delgado Master visits the Land of Fiction and steals part of the technology behind it, wiping out several nineteenth century fictional villains as he goes. He can also be seen in the following comic strips set during the Pertwee era:
 "The Glen of Sleeping" by Gerry Haylock and Dick O'Neill (TV Action 107–111)
 "Fogbound" by Frank Langford (Doctor Who Holiday Special 1973)
 "The Time Thief" by Steve Livesey (Doctor Who Annual 1974)
 "The Man in the Ion Mask" by Brian Williamson and Dan Abnett (Doctor Who Magazine Winter Special 1991)

In the IDW publication Prisoners of Time, a 12-issue series to celebrate the 50th anniversary of Doctor Who, the Master (drawn based on Ainley's portrayal) plays a major part. He is the villain in No. 6 and No. 7, meeting the Sixth and Seventh Doctors, attempting to trap the Sixth Doctor in an Auton-staffed asylum and encountering the Seventh as he attempts to drain the energy from a pair of higher-dimensional beings. The Ainley Master is revealed to have teamed up with the Ninth Doctor's disgraced ex-companion Adam Mitchell, who is travelling through time kidnapping the Doctor's companions as revenge, the Master having presented himself as another 'victim' of the Doctor rather than the villain he truly is. His role in the plan after Adam abducts Clara Oswald culminates in an out-of-sequence encounter with the Eleventh Doctor, the Doctor observing that it has been a pleasantly long time since he saw this version of the Master. However, when the Eleventh Doctor manages to summon his previous ten selves to Adam's fortress to rescue their companions when Adam threatens to kill them all, the Master reveals that his true plan is to channel his stolen chronal energies through the Doctors' combined TARDISes, thus destroying the Universe. Horrified at the Master's evil scale and encouraged to take action by Rose and the Ninth, Tenth, and Eleventh Doctors, Adam stands up to the Master, sacrificing himself to disable the Master's equipment. The Master escapes, noting that he enjoyed the chance to cause further chaos, but his plan has been thwarted. This is the only story in any medium  in which the Ninth and Eleventh Doctors encounter the Master.

2017 sees the return of Delgado's incarnation in Doorway to Hell, a Doctor Who Magazine comic strip printed in DWM #508–511, set after the events of Frontier in Space from the Master's perspective. This depicts an out-of-sequence encounter between Delgado's Master and the Twelfth Doctor in the year 1973, with the Master initially assuming that the Twelfth Doctor is the Fourth who regenerated after an explosion in the TARDIS that left the Doctor trapped on Earth in this time, until the Doctor informs his foe that he is from far in the Master's future. At the story's conclusion the critically wounded Master regenerates inside his TARDIS after the Doctor and the human family he has been living with deflects an attack with the "artron energy" the family absorbed while the Doctor's TARDIS was healing in their garden.

Titan Comics published a series of comics which included a Master who was a contemporary of the War Doctor. This Master has the appearance of a young boy. In his final appearance, he regenerated into the Derek Jacobi incarnation seen in "Utopia".

Audio plays 

The Master has made regular appearances in various audio plays produced by Big Finish. Geoffrey Beevers, Derek Jacobi, Michelle Gomez, Eric Roberts, John Simm and Sacha Dhawan have all reprised the role from the television series. While Mark Gatiss, Alex Macqueen, Gina McKee, James Dreyfus and Milo Parker portray versions of the Master original to Big Finish. Jon Culshaw has performed as the Roger Delgado and Anthony Ainley incarnations of the Master.

The Master appears in the Big Finish Productions Dust Breeding, where Geoffrey Beevers reprised the role. The story reveals that at some point after Survival, the Master's Trakenite body is damaged when he attempts to take control of a psychic weapon trapped in the painting The Scream, which returns him to his walking corpse state once again. He is presented using the alias Mr Seta, another anagram of Master.

In Master, the origin of the Master and the Doctor's enmity is explored. As children, a school bully attempted to drown the Master but was killed by the Doctor in defence. Unable to cope with the guilt and grief, the young Doctor made a deal with Death to take away his pain, inadvertently transferring the memories and guilt of the murder to the Master. In the main plot, the Seventh Doctor (Sylvester McCoy) has made another deal with Death to remove the Master's memory and let him live in peace for ten years, in exchange for the Master then becoming Death's Champion. Upon learning this, the Master absolves the Doctor of his actions as a child before having his memories restored and becoming Death's servant once again.

An alternate-universe Master appears in the Big Finish audio play Sympathy for the Devil, voiced by Mark Gatiss, as part of the Doctor Who Unbound series. In this version of events, an alternate Third Doctor — now voiced by David Warner — does not arrive for his exile on Earth until 1997. Without the Doctor's help, UNIT was unable to cope with a series of extraterrestrial disasters, and the political landscape of the planet changed drastically. Stranded on Earth, the Master worked as an advisor to the United Nations. This version of the Master later appears in Big Finish's The New Adventures of Bernice Summerfield range, opposite Warner's Doctor, when Bernice Summerfield is temporarily pulled into the Unbound universe. He later escapes to Benny's universe and is recruited by the Daleks to stop a plan by the War Master that threatens to destroy the universe.

Beevers returned to Big Finish in April 2022 to play another Unbound alternate version of the Master, opposite Colin Baker's alternate Doctor known as The Warrior, in the Doctor Who Unbound release - Doctor of War: Genesis.

The Master was set to appear in the television story The Hollows of Time, proposed for the show's 23rd season but ultimately never produced. When Big Finish adapted the story for their Lost Stories range, while Colin Baker and Nicola Bryant voiced their original roles as the Sixth Doctor and Peri, rights to the Master could not be obtained (and Anthony Ainley had died), so the role of Professor Stream (originally meant as the Master's alias—another anagram) was played by David Garfield and left ambiguous as to his true identity, the story presented as a semi-flashback with the Doctor and Peri's memories distorted so that they cannot clearly recall certain key details.

The Master, played by Geoffrey Beevers, returns in the Fourth Doctor audio plays Trail of the White Worm, The Oseidon Adventure, The Evil One, Requiem for the Rocket Men and Death Match. Beevers also appears in the fiftieth anniversary story The Light at the End, where he attempts to erase the Doctor's travels by using an advanced weapon to erase the TARDIS from existence, and in the Companion Chronicle Mastermind, which looks at how he stole a new body in the early twentieth century after his essence escaped from the Eighth Doctor's TARDIS, and survived by possessing a series of human hosts until he tricked UNIT into helping him regain access to his TARDIS.

Alex Macqueen plays a new incarnation of the Master – existing after Eric Roberts' incarnation (and the subsequent corpse form played by Beevers) – in the Seventh Doctor release UNIT: Dominion pretending to be a future version of the Doctor before his true identity is revealed. He goes on to become a recurring antagonist in the Eighth Doctor's Dark Eyes series where it is explained that the Time Lords resurrected the Master to fight in an approaching conflict, implied to be the Time War. The events surrounding the Master's resurrection were depicted in the Ravenous series five years later.

Chris Finney plays a character named 'Keith Potter' in the story The End of the Line from the audio anthology The Sixth Doctor: The Last Adventure, later revealed to be an avatar under the control of the Master.

The Master, played again by Geoffrey Beevers, makes a cameo appearance in series 10 of the Doctor Who spin-off Jago & Litefoot, and later featured as the main villain for the eleventh series.

To mark forty-five years since the Master's first appearance, Big Finish released a trilogy of stories featuring the Geoffrey Beevers and Alex Macqueen incarnations of the Master in 2016. And You Will Obey Me features the Beevers Master encountering the Fifth Doctor, while Vampire of the Mind pits the Sixth Doctor against Macqueen's Master. In both stories, the two Masters are characterized very differently from their previous appearances. In the final story of the trilogy – The Two Masters – it is explained that the two Masters swapped bodies after the Macqueen Master went back in time and caused the event that gave the Beevers Master his emaciated corpse form. This results in a universe-destroying paradox fixed by the Seventh Doctor, returning the two Masters to their rightful bodies and erasing their memories of the events.

In December 2017, Derek Jacobi reprised his role as the Master for The War Master, an ongoing series of audios set during the Time War, having originally appeared in the 2007 episode "Utopia". The first series ends with the Master using a chameleon arch to turn himself into an infant human, setting up the events of "Utopia". Subsequent series occur earlier in the War Master's life and depict him getting involved with various battles in the Time War, sometimes at the behest of the Time Lords and sometimes for his own ends. Mark Gatiss made a guest appearance as the alternate-universe Master in series four. Paul McGann briefly plays the Master in series five. Jacobi has also appeared as the War Master in several other Big Finish ranges, including UNIT: Cyber-Reality and the first volume of Gallifrey: Time War.

James Dreyfus portrays an early incarnation of the Master opposite David Bradley as the First Doctor in Doctor Who: The First Doctor Adventures. Dreyfus also appears in the Second Doctor audio The Home Guard, the Fourth Doctor audio Solo and the Seventh Doctor audio The Psychic Circus.

In May 2018, it was announced that the fifth series of The Diary of River Song would feature the title character, River Song, encountering four incarnations of the Master. As well as Beevers and Jacobi returning, this release saw Eric Roberts and Michelle Gomez make their Big Finish debuts as their incarnations of the Master. This release explains how the Master (Roberts) was able to escape the Eye of Harmony, stuck in the time vortex until River's intervention enables him to escape back into the universe.

Like Jacobi, Michelle Gomez also performs her incarnation of the Master (renamed Missy) for an ongoing audio series. Missy premiered in February 2019 and featured The Monk played by Rufus Hound. The second series introduced a character known as The Lumiat – revealed to be the next incarnation of The Master, the immediate successor to Missy – played by Gina McKee. It is explained that, after her "poetic" death at the hands of her predecessor, Missy used an Elysian field to transfer her consciousness into a duplicate body created from her own dying cells and trigger regeneration. Motivated by her recent attempt at redemption, she edited the duplicate to remove all the negative aspects of her personality and became a benevolent force in the universe, adopting the title Lumiat. Missy encounters the Lumiat trying to undo some of her earlier incarnation's evil deeds. Sickened by her future self, Missy kills the Lumiat with a TCE and abandons her to regenerate, implying the process might cause them to return to evil. In the third volume, Gomez and Hound were joined by Gemma Whelan as the Meddling Nun – another incarnation of the Monk.

Beevers, Jacobi, Roberts, and Gomez appeared in the fourth volume of the Eighth Doctor series Ravenous in October 2019. In Planet of Dust, the Doctor and his companions encounter the Burnt Master (Beevers) on the planet Parrak, where it is explained that he has once again returned to his emaciated corpse form following his time in the body of Bruce (Roberts) before being killed by the Ravenous. In Day of the Master, the Eighth Doctor encounters the Bruce Master. At the same time, his companions Liv Chenka and Helen Sinclair are confronted by the War Master (Jacobi) and Missy (Gomez), respectively. By the end of the story, the War Master, Missy, and the Bruce Master are sent by the Time Lords to the tomb where the Burnt Master is buried, using technology acquired earlier in the story to grant him a new regeneration cycle and, it is implied, turning him into the Alex Macqueen incarnation of the Master. The story also suggests the Bruce Master has his memory wiped and is flung into the time vortex by his future selves, ultimately leading him back to Parrak in his Burnt Master form to preserve the timeline.

As part of the Time Lord Victorious multi-platform storyline, a pair of Short Trips stories introduced the Roger Delgado and Anthony Ainley incarnations of the Master to Big Finish – Master Thief by Sophie Iles and Lesser Evils by Simon Guerrier were released in October 2020 with Jon Culshaw serving as narrator and voicing both incarnations of the Master.

In January 2021, to mark the fiftieth anniversary of the Master's first television appearance, Big Finish released Masterful, a three-part special written by James Goss uniting every living television and audio incarnation of the Master (other than Sacha Dhawan due to licensing). It saw John Simm reprise his role as the Harold Saxon version of the Master and introduced Milo Parker as a young incarnation of the Master. Beevers, Gatiss, Jacobi, Macqueen, Roberts, and Gomez all reprised their roles. Gina McKee makes a cameo appearance as the Lumiat and Jon Culshaw voices Kamelion impersonating the Ainley Master. In the story, the Saxon Master has killed the Doctor and taken control of the universe using an entropy wave that has destabilized his body and threatens to destroy the universe. He summons his previous selves in an attempt to steal their lives and heal himself. The intervention of Missy, the alternate-universe Master and Jo Grant thwarts Saxon's plans and, after discovering that the entropy wave is a sentient manifestation of the Master from the future – their final incarnation, a being of pure rage and insanity – the War Master kills his other incarnations (including himself) to cause a paradox and return the universe to normal. The special edition release included an original audiobook Terror of the Master written by Trevor Baxendale, narrated by Jon Culshaw and featuring the Delgado Master and the Third Doctor. This story is set to be released independently of Masterful in March 2023.

Roberts returned as the Master once again in March 2021 for a three-part special release entitled Master!, featuring Chase Masterson as Vienna Salvatore. Following the events of Ravenous, the Master is rescued from the vortex by a scientist named Lila Kreeg (Laura Aikman) – whom the Master had manipulated using a psychic link into freeing him – and steals the identity of a business magnate on twenty-third century Earth. Vienna is hired by the Daleks to assassinate the Master but, with Kreeg's help, succeeds only in sending the Master back into the time vortex. Masterson and Roberts returned for a second series - Nemesis Express - released in October 2022.

At Big Finish Day 2022, it was announced that Sacha Dhawan will reprise the role of The Master from the television series for a new audio series - Call Me Master.

Short stories 
Eric Saward included Anthony Ainley's incarnation of the Master in his short story, "Birth of a Renegade," in the Doctor Who 20th Anniversary Special one-off magazine, published by Radio Times (and in the United States by Starlog Press) in 1983.

In "The Feast of the Stone," a short story by Cavan Scott and Mark Wright that follows on from the Scream of the Shalka, the story pivots around the nature of the android version of the Master, his reality as an extension of the reality of the TARDIS, and his relationship with the Doctor.

The Master is seen to escape the Eye of Harmony in the short story "Forgotten" by Joseph Lidster, published in Short Trips: The Centenarian. The story ends with him left in 1906 in possession of a human male's body.

Martha Jones' year long journey across a Master-controlled planet Earth is detailed in the short story collection The Story of Martha, which was released on 26 December 2008.

In the Doctor Who short eBook The Spear of Destiny by Marcus Sedgwick, featuring the Third Doctor, the Master disguises himself as a Viking called Frey (Old Norse for Master) and tries to take the Spear of Destiny.

Webcasts 
In 2003, an android version of the character (resembling the Delgado version of the Master and voiced by Derek Jacobi) appeared in the animated webcast Scream of the Shalka. This version of the Master exists as a companion to the Doctor, albeit a slightly sinister one. Exactly why the Doctor created an android duplicate of the Master is not stated, but it is revealed the Master was faced with the choice of permanent death or one last chance at life on a leash to make amends for the harm he had caused over the years. Able to pilot the Doctor's TARDIS but physically unable to leave the ship, this version's Master may have has some psychic abilities but if so they are far weaker than those he once possessed.

To promote the audio series Master!, Eric Roberts reprised the role of the Master onscreen for the first time since 1996 in a series of video prequels posted to social media by Big Finish Productions; starting with a Halloween-themed video in November 2020 and subsequent Christmas and Valentine's Day messages. In the final message, the Master is heard calling out to "Lila," a character from the audio series that the Master manipulates into granting his freedom from the vortex.

Audio book 
 The Killing Stone (BBV Audio, read by Richard Franklin)

Computer game 
 Doctor Who: Destiny of the Doctors, played by Ainley. This was his last performance as the Master before his death.
 Lego Dimensions, featuring a Lego version of Missy voiced by Gomez.

Role playing game 
The Doctor Who role-playing game published by FASA in 1985 has two modules outlining the Master's personal history, a timeline of his activities, and an inventory of much of the equipment he has obtained during his travels. Most notably, the modules identify the Meddling Monk as an alias the Master has used in his early attempts to alter the history of Earth.

Board Game 
The 1980 board game Doctor Who: The Game of Time & Space features information on the characters within the game.
Of note, it states that "The Monk," The War Chief and the Master are all the same person.

Parody 
In the Comic Relief sketch Doctor Who: The Curse of Fatal Death, the Master was played by Jonathan Pryce.

List of appearances
The actors who have played the role of the Master in the series and the dates of their first and last televised appearances in the role are:

Notes

See also 

 List of Doctor Who villains
 List of television programs where multiple actors played one character

References

External links 

 

Television characters introduced in 1971
Time Lords
Recurring characters in Doctor Who
Doctor Who audio characters
Extraterrestrial supervillains
Television supervillains
Fictional characters with disfigurements
Fictional mass murderers
Fictional prime ministers of the United Kingdom
Fictional dictators
Fictional hypnotists and indoctrinators
Male characters in television
Female characters in television